Frank Charles may refer to:

Frank Charles (speedway rider) (1908–1939), British international motorcycle speedway rider
Frank Charles (baseball) (born 1969), baseball catcher

See also
Charles Frank (disambiguation)